Sarah Fisher Ames (1817–1901) was an American sculptor.

Biography
Ames née Clampitt was born in 1817 in Lewes, Delaware. Ames studied art in Boston and in Rome. She married Joseph Alexander Ames, a portrait painter.

She produced at least five busts of Abraham Lincoln. During the American Civil War, Ames directed the hospital situated in the U.S. Capitol. She was a good friend of Lincoln, either through her position at the hospital or the antislavery movement. Rufus Wilson, author of Lincoln in Portraiture, claimed that Ames knew Lincoln "in an intimate and friendly way" through her work at the hospital. Fisher was one of the first sculptors of Lincoln, creating a marble bust of Lincoln for the U.S. Senate in 1866. That sculpture is in the U.S. Capitol Building. Her busts of Lincoln are also located at the Massachusetts State House, the Williams College Museum of Art, the Lynn Historical Society, and the Woodmere Art Museum.

Ames exhibited her work at The Woman's Building at the 1893 World's Columbian Exposition in Chicago, Illinois.

She died in Washington, D.C., in 1901.

References

External links

1817 births
1901 deaths
People from Lewes, Delaware
19th-century American sculptors
American women sculptors
19th-century American women artists
Sculptors from Delaware